Pontoise is a commune in the northwestern suburbs of Paris, France.

Administration
Pontoise is the official préfecture (capital) of the Val-d'Oise département, although in reality the préfecture building and administration, as well as the department council (conseil général), are located in the neighboring commune of Cergy, which is regarded as the de facto capital of Val-d'Oise.

Pontoise is also the seat of the Arrondissement of Pontoise. The sous-préfecture building and administration, unlike the préfecture, are located inside the commune of Pontoise.

Sister cities 
The city of Pontoise has three sister city relationships with:
 Böblingen, Germany since 1956
 Sevenoaks, United Kingdom since 1964
 Geleen, Netherlands since 1962

Security 
Known for being a violent city in the late 20th century, with a criminal rate of 137.62 incidents per 1000 inhabitants, Cergy-Pontoise has enjoyed a significant decrease in violence in the first decade of the 21st century. By 2008, the rate had declined to 99.87, although this is still considered high. That rate has continued to decline in the second decade.

History
Pontoise is the historical capital of the Vexin français. Its foundation dates from Roman times (Pontisara). At that time, the rock peak overhanging the river Oise supported the defense of the fort which was on the Roman road, the Chaussée Jules César, between Lutetia (Paris) and Rotomagus (Rouen). The road still exists and is now part of the N14 from Paris to Rouen. It is also known to many people as the birthplace of the alchemist Nicholas Flamel.
With an over 2,000 year legacy, Pontoise still has vestiges of the past, such as medieval lanes, convents, churches and museums, and was awarded the "City of Art and History Label" in 2006.
The impressionist painter Camille Pissarro made it famous through many paintings which are present nowadays in the most famous art galleries in the world.

Climate
Pontoise has a oceanic climate (Köppen climate classification Cfb).

Demographics

Immigration

Transport

Pontoise is served by Pontoise station, a terminus on Paris RER line C and an intermediate terminus for suburban trains originating from Gare Saint-Lazare as well as a terminus for suburban trains from Gare du Nord. Some trains originating at Gare Saint-Lazare continue onto Gisors. For bus services, Stivo (formerly Services des Transports de l'Agglomération Nouvelle) operates within the new town of Cergy-Pontoise, and in and around Pontoise, with transport interchanges situated Place Charles de Gaulle and Parking Canrobert.

Pontoise – Cormeilles Aerodrome is the area airport.

Education
Public preschool through elementary schools include:
Seven preschools ('maternelles): des Cordeliers, Eugène-Ducher, de l'Hermitage, Laris, Ludovic-Piette, Jean-Moulin, Parc-aux-Charettes
Two primary schools: École primaire Gustave-Loiseau and École primaire des Maradas
Seven elementary schools (élémentaires): Paul-Cézanne, Eugène-Ducher, de l'Hermitage, des Larris, Jean-Moulin, Ludovic-Piette, Parc-aux-Charrettes

Public senior high schools/sixth-form colleges:
Lycée Camille Pissarro Pontoise
Lycée Alfred Kastler de Cergy-Pontoise, in Pontoise, also serves Cergy

There are also six private schools: École Saint-Martin-de-France (up to senior high school), École "Ella", École Saint-Louis, Établissement Vauban, Notre-Dame-de-la-Compassion (junior and senior high school)

Culture

Pontoise is one of the capitals of the impressionist movement. Many painters took as a starting point the city and its area for the creation of landscapes. Camille Pissarro lived there for seventeen years. Other artists lived or worked in the area such as Vincent van Gogh (Auvers-sur-Oise), Paul Cézanne, Paul Gauguin, Charles-François Daubigny, Gustave Caillebotte, Gustave Loiseau, etc.

Main sights
Cathédrale Saint-Maclou de Pontoise. It was built in the 12th century and reconstructed and enlarged in the 15th and 16th centuries. The tower, as well as the central portal, is in flamboyant style. The central body is flanked by Renaissance additions. The remaining 12th century part of the cathedral is to the back. To the North of the building is a Renaissance portal.
Musée de Pontoise (Musée Tavet-Delacour). The museum houses sculptures from the Middle Ages, manuscripts from the seventeenth century and paintings from the twentieth century
Musée Pissarro (Impressionist collections) and garden of the five senses. The Museum is situated in a bourgeoise house at the entrance of the old castle.

Parks and recreation
Parks:
Le Jardin de la Ville
Le Parc des Larris
Le jardin partagé de Marcouville
Le Jardin des Cinq Sens
Le Parc du Château de Marcouville
Les jardins et la terrasse basse du Dôme
Le Jardin des Lavandières
Plaines de jeux

Notable people
 Sébastien Carole (b. 1982), footballer
 Yarouba Cissako, footballer
 Koumba Cisse handball player
 Nicolas Flamel (c. 1340-1418), reputed alchemist, probably born here
 Jérémy Labor (b. 1992), footballer
 Christophe Lebon (b. 1982), swimmer
 Luc Loubaki, basketball player
 Édouard-Alfred Martel (1859-1938), Father of modern speleology
 Guiday Mendy (b. 1986), basketball player
 Aly Ndom, footballer
 Camille Pissarro, painter
 Yoann Rapinier, athlete
 Jacques Vallée, author, ufologist and former astronomer
 Jean-Éric Vergne, former Formula One driver currently competing in Formula E
 St William of Pontoise, hermit
 Rabbi Moses of Pontoise, 12th-century disciple of Rabbeinu Tam and mentioned in several Tosafot.
 Moussa Dembélé (French footballer), footballer
 Liza del Sierra, pornographic actress.
 A famous religious sister, Blessed Marie de l'Incarnation (1566-1618), formerly known as Madame Acarie, the foundress of the Reformed Carmelites in France, lived, died and was buried here in the Carmelite Monastery.
 William of Pontoise (d. 1192), medieval Benedictine
 Yacine Qasmi , moroccan footballer

See also
Communes of the Val-d'Oise department

References

External links

Pontoise official website
Tourism in Pontoise

Communes of Val-d'Oise
Subprefectures in France
Cergy-Pontoise
Val-d'Oise communes articles needing translation from French Wikipedia